The men's time trial H3 road cycling event at the 2020 Summer Paralympics took place on 31 August 2021, at Fuji Speedway, Tokyo. 16 riders competed in the event.

The H3 classification is for paraplegics with impairment from T4 thru T10. These riders operate a hand-operated cycle.

Results
The event took place on 31 August 2021, at 9:40:

References

Men's road time trial H3